Harold Lee (born 13 January 1933) is an English former professional footballer who played in the Football League for Mansfield Town.

References

1933 births
Living people
English footballers
Association football forwards
English Football League players
Derby County F.C. players
Doncaster Rovers F.C. players
Mansfield Town F.C. players